Lois Elaine Quam (born 1961) is an American executive who has worked in the public and the private sectors to expand access to health care. She was named three times to FORTUNE's list of the most influential women leaders in business, She has also served as a top leader at a major nonprofit organization dedicated to preserving the environment.

Professional career
As founding CEO of Ovations, a division of the FORTUNE 50 global corporation UnitedHealth Group (UNH) which provides health care and insurance benefits to seniors and public program beneficiaries, Quam and her team grew revenues to $32 billion in the span of eight years. She led a workforce of over 25,000 people and had direct responsibility for strategy, financial and operational performance, and business risk management at Ovations. Quam was instrumental in AARP's decision to award UnitedHealth the $4 billion health insurance program offered to AARP members, the largest transfer of an insurance offering in U.S. history. During her 17-year career at UnitedHealth, the company's revenues soared 17,000 percent and the stock price surged 400-fold. 
 
Quam's concerns about a warming climate also led her to leadership roles in the environmental space.  Her move into this arena was seen by observers as a sign that experienced leaders were moving into this sector because of climate change.  Steven Greenhouse, wrote in the New York Times, “With scientists voicing increased concern about climate change, some highly talented people have left other fields to help build the green economy.  For instance, Lois Quam, who helped create and run a $30 billion division of UnitedHealth Group, a health insurer, has joined the renewable energy cause.”  In Thomas L. Friedman's book, Hot, Flat, and Crowded, Quam calls the opportunity to invest in the new energy economy a “quintessentially American opportunity,” and “one of those national projects that is about big profits and big purposes; not just about making America richer, but the world better.” Quam worked in renewable energy investing and advised Norwegian environmental concerns.

In 2017, Quam accepted the position as President & Chief Executive Officer at Pathfinder International, a US-based nonprofit working in more than 20 countries to champion sexual and reproductive health and rights,

Public service
A citizen advocate for health care reform, in 1989 the morning after she gave birth to her first son, Quam was asked by Minnesota's Governor to chair the Minnesota Health Care Access Commission.  The commission's recommendations resulted in legislation that created Minnesota Care bringing health insurance to tens of thousands of Minnesotans.  As a result of her work in Minnesota, she served as a senior advisor to the President's Task Force on Health Care reform in 1993, with a particular focus on rural areas.

She was chosen by President Obama to head his signature Global Health Initiative at the Department of State, which provided more than $8 billion annually to work across 80 countries. Reporting directly to Secretary of State Hillary Clinton, Quam advanced a comprehensive strategy to increase U.S. global health diplomacy, created a $200 million public private partnership around maternal mortality, and introduce integrated systems approaches for global health problems.

From 2014 to June 2016, Quam was Chief Operating Officer at The Nature Conservancy. In 2017, she became the President & CEO of Pathfinder International.

She currently is an associate member of the faculty in the Division of Health Policy and Management at Columbia University's School of Public Health.

She has published article in the field of global health, rural health, and health policy.

Boards
Quam currently serves as a director of The Commonwealth Fund, member of the Council on Foreign Relations, advisory council member of the Humphrey School of Public Affairs at the University of Minnesota and vice chair of The Performance Theater.

Quam is a member of the Presiding Bishop's Advisory Council of the Evangelical Lutheran Church in America.   She previously served on the Commission for a New Lutheran Church and was a delegate from the American Lutheran Church to the World Council of Churches Assembly in 1983.

Quam serves on the trustee advisory board at the Center for American Progress having formerly served as a fellow at the center.

Quam has served on the board of editors for the British Medical Journal, and the boards of General Mills, Macalester College, the George C. Marshall Foundation and the University of Minnesota Foundation.

A Minnesotan native of Norwegian descent, she was named Norwegian American of the Year in 2005, and has written on Norway's role in the global economy.

Education
A Rhodes Scholar, Quam has degrees from Trinity College, University of Oxford and Macalester College. Quam has an honorary degree from Augsburg College, and was awarded the distinguished alumni degree from Macalester College.

Politics
Quam supports women's reproductive rights.  She is a proponent of a health care public option.

Quam has been active in the Democratic party in Minnesota and nationally throughout her life.  She was an elected delegate from the Fourth Congressional District in Minnesota to the 2008 Democratic Convention in Denver.  She attended her first state Minnesota Democratic convention in 1982 as an alternate delegate from Lyon County.

Personal
Quam grew up in Marshall, Minnesota.  She is married to Reuters foreign policy correspondent Arshad Mohammed. She was formerly married to Matt Entenza, a Minnesota politician.

References

1961 births
20th-century American businesspeople
21st-century American businesspeople
Alumni of Trinity College, Oxford
American women chief executives
Businesspeople from Minnesota
Macalester College alumni
Living people
People from Marshall, Minnesota
20th-century American businesswomen
21st-century American businesswomen